The Trailways Transportation System is an American network of approximately 70 independent bus companies that have entered into a brand licensing agreement. The company is headquartered in Fairfax, Virginia.

History 
The predecessor to Trailways Transportation System was founded February 5, 1936, by Burlington Transportation Company, Santa Fe Trails Transportation Company, Missouri Pacific Stages, Safeway Lines, Inc., and Frank Martz Coach Company.

The system originated with coast-to-coast service as the National Trailways Bus System (NTBS). Greyhound Lines had grown so quickly in the 1920s and 1930s that the Interstate Commerce Commission encouraged smaller independent operators to form the NTBS to provide competition. Unlike Greyhound, which centralized ownership, Trailways member companies became a formidable competitor while staying an association of almost 100 separate companies. In the 1950s, Morgan W. Walker, Sr., of Alexandria, Louisiana, became head of the southern division of the company. He had entered the business on a small scale during World War II as the Interurban Transportation Company of Alexandria. During the 1950s and 1960s, consolidation among bus operators resulted in four of the five original Trailways members becoming part of a new company, Continental Trailways, which eventually operated the majority of Trailways routes.

In 1968, under the leadership of major stockholder Kemmons Wilson, Holiday Inn acquired Continental Trailways, which remained a subsidiary of Holiday Inn until 1979, when Holiday Inn sold Trailways to private investor Henry Lea Hillman Sr., of Pittsburgh, Pennsylvania. In the years during which Trailways was a subsidiary of Holiday Inn, television commercials for Holiday Inn frequently showed a Trailways bus stopping at a Holiday Inn hotel.

Regular route bus ridership in the United States had been declining steadily since World War II despite minor gains during the 1973 and 1979 energy crises. By 1986, the Greyhound Bus Line had been spun off from the parent company to new owners, which resulted in Greyhound Lines becoming solely a bus transportation company. It was sold off to new owners headed by Fred Currey, a former executive with the largest member of the National Trailways Bus System. The old Greyhound parent had changed its name to Dial Corporation.

Under the new ownership in 1987, led by Currey, Greyhound Lines later acquired the former Continental Trailways company, the largest member of the Trailways system, effectively eliminating a large portion of bus competition. Although Greyhound negotiated cooperative schedules with Carolina Coach Company and Southeastern Trailways, two of the larger members of the Trailways system, many smaller carriers were effectively forced out of business. Greyhound later acquired Carolina and the intercity operations of Southeastern. Most of the survivors diversified into charters and tours.

Current members 

Today Trailways members are spread across North America. They provide charter bus service, bus tours and scheduled route services, with some members providing regular route service to areas not served by any other bus company on an interlining basis with Greyhound Lines, each other, and independent companies. Members also offer motorcoach charters and tours in competitive markets.

, Trailways members are:

 Abbott Trailways – Roanoke, VA
 Adirondack Trailways – Hurley, NY
 Amador Trailways of CA – Sacramento, CA
 Amador Trailways of NV – Reno, NV
 AmericanStar Trailways – Pismo Beach, CA
 AS Midway Trailways – Baltimore, MD
 Arrow Trailways of TX – Killeen, TX
 Birnie Trailways – Rome, NY
 Burlington Trailways – West Burlington, IA
 Capital Trailways of AL – Montgomery, AL
 Capital Trailways of GA – Columbus, GA
 Capital Trailways of Huntsville – Madison, AL
 Cavalier Coach Trailways – Boston, MA
 Coastal Georgia Trailways – Brunswick, GA
 Colonial Trailways – Mobile, AL
 Cross Country Tours Trailways – Spartanburg, SC
 Dakota Trailways – Spearfish, SD
 David Thomas Trailways – Philadelphia, PA
 Dean Trailways of MI – Lansing, MI
 Elbo Trailways, the Netherlands – Heino, Holland
 Excursions Trailways of IN – Ft. Wayne, IN
 Excursions Trailways of OH – Ottawa, OH
 First Class Trailways – St. Petersburg, FL
 First Priority Trailways – District Heights, MD
 Flagship Trailways – Cranston, RI
 Fullington Trailways – Clearfield, PA
 Gentry Trailways – Knoxville, TN
 Gold Line Trailways – Tuxedo, MD
 Great Canadian Trailways – Kitchener, Ontario
 Harlow's Trailways – Bismarck, ND
 Heartland Trailways – St. Joseph, MO
 Huskey Trailways – Festus, MO
 Huskey Trailways of Columbia – Columbia, MO
 Kobussen Trailways – Kaukauna, WI
 Kobussen Trailways of West WI – Bloomer, WI
 Lancaster Trailways, the Carolinas – Lancaster, SC
 Lancaster Trailways of Charleston – Lancaster, SC
 Lancaster Trailways of Myrtle Beach – Myrle Beach, SC
 Louisiana Trailways – Marrero, LA
 Martz Trailways – Wilkes-Barre, PA
 Mississippi Trailways – McComb, MS
 Mississippi Trailways of Madison – Madison, MS
 Mlaker Trailways – Davidsville, PA
 National Coach Trailways – Fredericksburg, VA
 New York Trailways – Hurley, NY
 NorthEast Trailways of ME – Lewiston, ME
 Northwestern Trailways – Spokane, WA
 Orange Belt Trailways – Visalia, CA
 Pacific Coachways Trailways – Garden Grove, CA
 Pine Hill Trailways – Hurley, NY
 Prairie Coach Trailways – Dell Rapids, SD
 Prairie Coach Trailways of ND – Fargo, ND
 Prairie Trailways – Chicago, IL
 Precious Cargo Trailways – Newbury, OH
 Red River Trailways – Shreveport, LA
 Salter Trailways – Jonesboro, LA
 Samson Trailways – Atlanta, GA
 Southern Trailways of AL – Jackson's Gap, AL
 Seitz Reisen Trailways of Germany – Ruhmansfelden, Bayern-Regen
 Sun Travel Trailways – Beaumont, TX
 Susquehanna Trailways – Williamsport, PA
 Thrasher Brothers Trailways – Birmingham, AL
 Utah Trailways – Salt Lake City, UT
 VIA Trailways of AZ – Tempe, AZ
 VIA Trailways of CA – Merced, CA
 Viking Trailways – Joplin, MO
 West Point Tours Trailways – Vails Gate, NY
 West Valley Trailways – Campbell, CA

See also 

 Jefferson Lines
 Laidlaw
 List of bus transit systems in the United States
 Peter Pan Bus Lines

References

External links 

 Trailways website

American companies established in 1936
Companies based in Fairfax, Virginia
Cooperatives in the United States
Franchises
Intercity bus companies of the United States
Transport companies established in 1936
Transportation companies based in Virginia